is a former Japanese professional golfer who competed on the U.S.-based LPGA Tour and the LPGA of Japan Tour (JLPGA). She was the top-ranked golfer in the Women's World Golf Rankings on three occasions in 2010.

Early life, family and amateur career
Miyazato was born on 19 June 1985 in Higashi, Okinawa, Japan. Her father and brothers are professional golfers. Her older brother Yūsaku has won seven times on the Japan Golf Tour and played in the 2018 Masters Tournament.

As an amateur in 2003, she won a professional event on the LPGA of Japan Tour, the Dunlop Ladies Open, in Miyagi Prefecture where she was attending high school at the time.

Professional career
In her 2004 rookie season on the JLPGA Tour Miyazato won five tournaments. In February 2005, she represented Japan along with Rui Kitada and won the inaugural Women's World Cup of Golf. In 2005, she won six events on the JLPGA tour, and was the #2 ranked player on the JLPGA Tour behind Yuri Fudoh.

In winning the Japan Open Championship at age 20 in 2005, Miyazato became the youngest player on the JLPGA Tour to win a major. Furthering the notion that Miyazato revived the JLPGA Tour after the retirement of Ayako Okamoto, over 32,000 spectators, the largest gallery ever to attend a JLPGA event, witnessed the final round.

At the LPGA Qualifying Tournament in Florida in December 2005, Miyazato easily secured her tour card for the 2006 season. She was under-par in four of the five rounds, and was 12 strokes ahead of the closest competitor, which set a record for the largest margin of victory. Back in Japan, on 15 December, she played the opening rounds of the Okinawa Open, becoming the first Japanese woman to compete in a domestic men's professional event, although she failed to make the cut for the final rounds.

In Miyazato’s fourth season on the LPGA Tour in 2009, she earned her first win at the Evian Masters in France, defeating Sophie Gustafson at the first hole of a sudden-death playoff.

In 2010, Miyazato won four of the first nine official tournaments on the LPGA Tour and on 21 June rose to number 1 in the Women's World Golf Rankings. She held the spot for only one week and was replaced by Cristie Kerr who held the spot for three weeks, before Miyazato regained the spot again on 19 July, by a narrow margin of 0.0006 average points.

In August, Miyazato won for the fifth time in 2010 at the Safeway Classic in Oregon, with a two-stroke victory over Kerr and Na Yeon Choi. She regained the top spot in the world rankings, which had been briefly retaken by Kerr, but then gave it up to Kerr on 25 October.

In 2011, Miyazato won the Order of Merit on the Ladies European Tour (LET), despite only playing in two events on that tour, the co-sponsored events with the LPGA. The LET has no minimum tournament requirements for membership and her second win at the Evian Masters, whose purse is much larger than most LET events, earned her enough to top the list.

In April 2012, Miyazato won her eighth LPGA event at the inaugural LPGA Lotte Championship in Hawaii, four strokes ahead of runners-up Azahara Muñoz and Meena Lee.

Miyazato has endorsements deals with Suntory, Bridgestone Corporation, Japan Airlines, Oakley, Honda, Hisamitsu, Mitsubishi Electric and NTT Docomo.

Her older brothers, Kiyoshi Miyazato and Yūsaku Miyazato are also professional golfers. She is not related to fellow Japanese LPGA Tour player Mika Miyazato.

On 27 May 2017, Kyodo News Agency reported that Miyazato would retire at the end of the season. Her last tournament was the 2017 Evian Championship.

Miyazato is the first golfer to have achieved the world number one ranking without ever winning a major. Her best finish was third three times.

Professional wins (25)

LPGA Tour (9)

LPGA Tour playoff record (1–0)

JLPGA Tour (15)

Tournament in bold denotes major championships in JLPGA Tour.

Other (1)
2005 Women's World Cup of Golf (with Rui Kitada)

Results in LPGA majors
Results not in chronological order before 2015.

^ The Evian Championship was added as a major in 2013

CUT = missed the half-way cut
"T" = tied

Summary

Most consecutive cuts made – 7 (2012 Kraft Nabisco – 2013 U.S. Open)
Longest streak of top-10s – 2 (2009 U.S. Open - 2009 British Open)

LPGA Tour career summary

 Official as of 2017 season

* Includes matchplay and other events without a cut.

JLPGA prize money

World ranking
Position in Women's World Golf Rankings at the end of each calendar year.

^ Miyazato was last ranked on 25 September 2017. She dropped from the ranking following her retirement.

Team appearances
Amateur
Espirito Santo Trophy (representing Japan): 2002

Professional
World Cup (representing Japan): 2005 (winners), 2006
International Crown (representing Japan): 2014

References

External links

 

Japanese female golfers
LPGA of Japan Tour golfers
LPGA Tour golfers
Ladies European Tour golfers
Asian Games medalists in golf
Asian Games gold medalists for Japan
Asian Games silver medalists for Japan
Golfers at the 2002 Asian Games
Medalists at the 2002 Asian Games
Sportspeople from Okinawa Prefecture
Ryukyuan people
1985 births
Living people
21st-century Japanese women